George Ballard Bowers (July 15, 1878 January 9, 1944) served in the California State Assembly for the 78th district from 1931 to 1935 and during the Spanish–American War. During World War I he served in the United States Army.

References

United States Army personnel of World War I
American military personnel of the Spanish–American War
1878 births
1944 deaths
20th-century American politicians
Republican Party members of the California State Assembly
People from Decatur, Indiana